Majid Musisi (sometimes spelt Magid Musisi) (15 September 1967 – 13 December 2005) was a Ugandan footballer who was billed as being the first Ugandan footballer to sign for a European club.

Background and Education 
Musisi was born to Siraje Katende and Deborah Namutebi. He attended New Mulago Primary School and later on Bashir High School but then dropped out of school to pursue a football career

Career
Majid Musisi, like several other football stars from the eighties, nurtured his football career at the renowned Mulago playground, popularly known as 'Maracana' in reference to the famous Brazilian stadium. Alongside the likes of Adam Semugabi and Rajab Sekalye, he was one of the top prospects at New Mulago Primary School.

Stocky, powerful and endowed with speed, Musisi rapidly outgrew his age and stood out among his peers so much so that in 1983 – at just 16 years – second-tier side Pepsi FC snapped him up. In the process, Majid Musisi abandoned studies at Bashir High School in Wandegeya. After an impressive season, SC Villa's tactician David Otti noticed the youngster and quickly enrolled him into the Villa squad that was preparing for the Cecafa Club Championship in January 1985.

However, Majid Musisi missed the trip when his passport was delayed but made the Villa squad that travelled to Sudan to face El-Hilal in the Africa Club Championship three weeks later.
At the time, SC Villa was an emerging force with two league titles already under their belt. Rogers Nsubuga was the club's leading marksman with Ronald Vubya and Shaban Mwinda not far off.

The club also had promising strikers like Issa Kawooya and George Muwanguzi to beef up the attack. Did SC Villa really need Majid Musisi? Many fans wondered at the time. Otti knew better and was instantly vindicated even though he resigned shortly after due to poor results. Under new coach Timothy Ayiekoh, Musisi would make his long-awaited debut against Maroons, scoring twice and followed it up with one goal against Heroes.

For some reason, however, Ayiekoh preferred tested strikers in big matches. In the few matches he played, Ayiekoh deployed him on the right wing, a position that didn't suit him well. So in August 1985, his career took a huge turn that would eke his name into Ugandan football echelons. Villa versus Express…the whole Kampala would come to a standstill. With thousands of fans still forcing their way to enter Nakivubo stadium, Majid Musisi, given a rare start, fired in two quick goals in the first four minutes to give SC Villa a sweet 2–0 win over Express.

The story at the end of the match wasn't the result, but a 'mysterious' Villa player that had scored even before many entered. Despite the fact that Villa didn't win any silverware that season, the writing was on the wall that they were headed for bigger things. Indeed, things turned for the better when in 1986 season, Polly Ouma took over as Villa coach. On his part, he improved his 1985 tally of six goals to eight. SC Villa won its first league and Cup double.

Then the goals started flowing in 1987; He scored three goals as SC Villa won the Cecafa Club Championship and when Nsubuga got sidelined by injury, Ouma played Majid Musisi in his favoured central role, scoring eight goals in the first six league games. His sharpness was so irresistible that Cranes coach Barnabas Mwesiga handed the 20-year-old his debut in July 1987. It was a 1988 Olympic qualifier against Mozambique.

With Majid Musisi partnering the great Phillip Omondi on the frontline, the combo was a joy to watch as they tore apart the Mozambique side with each picking up a brace in the 4–1 win. In the return leg, the duo scored a goal each in the 2–0 win to make sure of Uganda's progress to the next stage. At Villa, Vubya was the perfect foil for Majid Musisi, occupying opponents and picking out Musisi's intelligent runs with inch-perfect passes. At the end of the season, Musisi was crowned top scorer with 28 goals.

Later that year, the pair defied a Fufa directive and appeared for their Lugave clan in the Bika By'Abaganda football championship just days before the crucial Olympic qualifier against Zambia. So, when the federation suspended them, there was public outcry. FUFA (Federation of Uganda Football Association) had no option but to recall the two players and ironically, it was Musisi and Vubya who made the difference as Uganda won the home leg 2–1.

However, the Zambians would go on to eliminate Uganda but when the two teams met in the CECAFA Cup later that year, Majid Musisi ran rings around the Zambians, scoring a hat-trick and at the end of the event, he emerged the top scorer. Fittingly, he was voted the 1987 Footballer of the Year. Patrick Kawooya, the filthy rich SC Villa boss, was one of Musisi's biggest admirers. He rented him a plush house at Najjanankumbi, a Kampala suburb, fully furnished with a refrigerator, cooker, video system, standby generator and other luxuries.

"I remember one time Musisi came to me with a bag full of money and we went to Kyebando where we purchased a plot of land, it was a lot of money", Majid Musisi's mother Namutebi recollects. She says the entire family depended on Majid Musisi. "When he hit headlines, he took over the responsibility of the entire family and started paying school fees for about 12 of his siblings", she adds.

Majid Musisi and Kawooya were so close that in many ways, he [Musisi] was the go-between for other players.

"At the time, many of the upcoming Villa players like me used to channel our problems through Majid Musisi and the following day, you would get it", says Charles Sebugwawo former SC Villa player.
Goals, goals, goals

Because of his well-built frame and fearless approach no defender could go with him toe to toe. Fans nicknamed him 'Tyson,' which was a direct comparison to the then young boxing heavyweight champion Mike Tyson, who also left destruction in his wake. 'Magic' is another popular tag they called him because of his style of play. In the 1988 season, however, Majid Musisi endured a dip in form and his self-belief took a hit.

Drama unfolded in the decisive league game against KCC, when Majid Musisi missed a couple of sitters and even failed to convert from the spot when the Jogoos were trailing 1–2. But when Vubya equalised with a few minutes left, Kawooya went on the touchline and usurped the powers of Geoff Hudson, Villa coach. He asked John Kaweesi to warm up in place of the misfiring Majid Musisi.

But just as they waited for a dead ball situation, Majid Musisi scored the winner in stoppage time and, ironically, Kawooya raced the full length of the pitch to carry Musisi shoulder high. At the end of the season, Majid Musisi scored a respectable 13 league goals. But that, by Majid Musisi's standards, was a step down despite missing a number of games due to an ankle injury.

Majid Musisi would later score a brace to eject KCC from the Uganda Cup before netting a spectacular goal against Express in the Uganda Cup final as Villa won the league and Cup double. A week later, he extended his act in the Bika By'Abaganda (Buganda Clans Football League, leading the Lugave clan to a 5–0 demolition of Ngabi in the final. The story was different in 1989; Musisi not only helped Villa to a third 'double' but also recaptured the top scorer's crown with 15 goals.

To cap a successful season, Majid Musisi topscored the CECAFA Cup with four goals – also converted in the final shootout as Uganda beat Malawi to win the event after 12 years. In 1990, SC Villa and Musisi remained dominant on the local scene, with the Jogoos retaining the league as Majid Musisi's 28 goals equalled Isa Sekatawa's three top-scoring awards. Earlier in September, he was a thorn in the DR Congo defence when he scored a late winner in the 2–1 triumph in a Nations Cup qualifier.

He was not done yet; in December, he put the icing on the cake as Uganda beat Sudan 2–0 to retain the CECAFA title. Unsurprisingly, he picked up a second 'Footballer of the Year' award. In 1991, he scored 17 league goals to become the first player to reach 100 league goals but Villa ended the season empty-handed.

However, they had every reason to celebrate after finishing runners-up in the Africa Club Championship. Majid Musisi scored a couple of goals in that fairytale campaign but what stood out was his diving header against Nigeria's Iwuanyanwu Nationale in the semi-final.

In 1992, Majid Musisi was on track to make light work of Jimmy Kirunda's record of 32 goals a season when he netted a mindboggling 29 goals in the league's first round. In his final league appearance, he tormented KCC goalie Sadiq Wassa to the extent that when he scored his fourth in the 5–0 win, he simply walked off the field as if to suggest that domestic opposition no longer matched his ambitions. Nevertheless, he extended his league tally to 144 goals.

It was a blessing in disguise when French side Stade Rennes signed the player for a whopping $180,000. Villa used part of that money to buy the Makindye-Luwafu club house.
Simply unstoppable

Majid Musisi can best be described as an orthodox forward, one who makes scoring look easy. He was a natural finisher who got the best out of his physical presence. He was also a deadball specialist. On the other hand, he was a tireless workhorse with exceptional firepower; added to pace, good dribbling skills and a great aerial presence, he was the most difficult striker to mark.

While many of today's strikers avoid tackles, Majid Musisi was a nightmare for man-markers. Yet despite his fearsome frame, Musisi was always composed and never lost his temper or retaliated yet many teams purposely set out to eliminate him.
Professional football

At Rennes, Majid Musisi was a regular presence and scored a number of crucial goals, which prompted Turkish side Bursaspor to sign him in 1997 for a reported $1m. He later moved to Dardanelspor, another Turkish club before he brought the curtain down on his professional career in 2001. "Dardanelspor still owes him money", says Nantongo, without disclosing the amount.

[Musisi (front row second right) at Dardanelspor]

Musisi (front row second right) at Dardanelspor

Majid Musisi returned to Uganda in 2001 and rejoined SC Villa. However, it was clear he was over the hill and failed to show the predatory skills of the past. He remained a key player for Uganda, captaining the side on several occasions and the highlight was a hat-trick in 1998 in the 5–0 win over Rwanda. However, he unceremoniously ended his Cranes career when Harrison Okagbue, the then coach threw him out of camp for breaching the team's code of conduct in 2000.

In 2002, he joined Vietnamese side Da Nang but returned in 2004 and joined Ggaba United. There, he failed to get off the mark and called it a day. For all the great goals he scored, Uganda's failure to qualify for the Nations Cup somehow dented his overall greatness. In 1991, Musisi and his Villa teammates turned down a national call-up before a crucial Nations Cup qualifier against DR Congo.

After spending two seasons with the Rennes in France where he played a total of 64 matches scoring 18 goals (League 2 and Coupe de France), he was sold to the Turkish top-flight club Bursaspor and later to Çanakkale Dardanelspor for 1.8 billion Ugandan shillings transfer fee ($1 million), making a record in the transfer market for the most expensive Uganda import. In the 1996 season, he was voted Best Foreign Player of the Year in the Turkish league. After playing in Turkey he had a spell playing for Đà Nẵng in Vietnam. He founded the now famous Bursaspor crocodile walk goal celebration during the UEFA Intertoto Cup match against German side Karlsruher SC on 2 August 1995.

He also played for the Ugandan national team.

Controversy

Personal life
Magid Musisi was married to Suzan Nantongo with whom he had separated shortly before his death. Musisi fathered seven children

Death
He died after a long illness on December 13, 2005 at his mother's home in Bwaise, a city suburb of Kampala, where he has been staying after his condition worsened. His body was transferred to his Muyenga home, from where it will be taken to neighbouring Bukasa for burial at 4pm on December 14, 2005.

References

External links
 Rennes profile
 

1967 births
2005 deaths
Ugandan footballers
Uganda international footballers
Stade Rennais F.C. players
Expatriate footballers in France
Bursaspor footballers
Dardanelspor footballers
Expatriate footballers in Turkey
Süper Lig players
SC Villa players
Association football forwards
Sportspeople from Kampala